Pinjra is an Urdu language Pakistani television series directed by Kashif Nisar and written by Imran Nazir. First broadcast in Pakistan by A-Plus TV, It features actors Yumna Zaidi, Noman Ijaz, Kiran Haq, Samina Ahmed, Hassan Ahmed, Farah Tufail and Faiza Gillani. Premiering on 25 January 2017, Pinjra ended its run on 2 August 2017 after telecasting 27 episodes.

Cast
Yumna Zaidi as Aasiya, Vanni of Jahanzaib Mazari
Noman Ijaz as Aurengzeb (Ranga) Mazari
Kiran Haq as Zulaikha, wife of Jahanzaib Mazari
Hassan Niazi as Jahanzaib Mazari 
Samina Ahmad as Jannat Bibi
Daniyal Raheel as Shahzaib Mazari
Azra Aftab as Sakina
Hassan Ahmed as Ch Mubashir 
Farah Tufail as Fareeda, sister of Jahanzaib Mazari
Faiza Gillani as Sakina
Sonia Nazir as Zubeida
Umer Darr as Lala, Zulaikha's brother
Agha Mustafa Hassan as Waqar

Theme
The series is based on social and moral issues revolving around gender discrimination in the rural society, specifically related to the concept of Vani. The story tells the journey of Amtul Rafay, a young girl who is sold off by her family to compensate another family where her brother had killed her fiancé. Simultaneously it revolves around reality based issues with different characters within the same plot.

Accolades

References

External links
Official website

2017 Pakistani television series debuts
2017 Pakistani television series endings
Urdu-language television shows
Pakistani drama television series
A-Plus TV original programming